The Canon de 274 modèle 1887/1893 were a family of French naval guns developed in the years before World War I that armed a variety of warships of the French Navy.  Guns salvaged from scrapped ships found a second life as coastal artillery and railway artillery during World War I and World War II.

Design
The mle 1887/1893 guns were typical built-up guns of the period with several layers of steel reinforcing hoops.  The guns used an interrupted screw breech and fired separate loading bagged charges and projectiles.  The two designs were similar in construction and performance, the main difference between the two models being their weight 37.6 tonnes for the 1887 and 35.4 tonnes for the 1893.  The later Canon de 274 modèle 1893/1896, despite being shorter, used a larger propellant charge which gave them higher muzzle velocity and range.

Naval use
Mle 1887/1893 guns armed pre-dreadnought battleships and ironclads of the French Navy built or refit between 1887-1902.

Pre-dreadnought battleships
  - The secondary armament of this ship consisted of two mle 1887s mounted in single gun turrets on lateral sponsons amidships.
  - The secondary armament of this ship consisted of two mle 1887s mounted in single gun turrets on lateral sponsons amidships.
  - The secondary armament of this ship consisted of two mle 1887s mounted in single gun turrets on lateral sponsons amidships.
  - The secondary armament of this ship consisted of two mle 1893s mounted in single gun turrets on lateral sponsons amidships.
  - The secondary armament of this ship consisted of two mle 1893s mounted in single gun turrets on lateral sponsons amidships.

Ironclads
Courbet - This ironclad received three mle 1893s in single mounts during a refit in the 1890s.

Railway guns
A number of mle 1887/1893 naval guns were converted to railway guns under the designation Canon de 274 modèle 87/93 Glissement and saw action during both the First and Second World Wars.

Ammunition
Ammunition was of separate loading type with a bagged charge and projectile.

The guns were able to fire:
 Armor Piercing Capped - 
 Common Incendiary - 
 Semi-Armor Piercing Capped -

Photo gallery

Bibliography

References

External links
 http://www.navweaps.com/Weapons/WNFR_10-45_m1893.php

Naval guns of France
274 mm artillery